Fandemonium is a neologism coined by Van Miller. It may refer to:
 Fandemonium (publisher), a UK publishing company 
 Fandemonium (book), a book by the Red Hot Chili Peppers
 Fandemonium (comics), a story arc in the comic book series The Wicked + The Divine
 Fandemonium (convention), a convention that occurs in Nampa, Idaho
 Fandemonium (TV series), a reality-TV style program on MuchMusic